Mor lam sing (Thai/Isan หมอลำซิ่ง) is a fast-paced, racy and modernized version of the traditional Lao/Isan song form mor lam (for ex:in 1986) .  Sing comes from the English word "racing" (a reference to the music's speed and its origins among Isan's biker fraternity). In this style, the lead singer is accompanied by the khaen, Western drums, electric guitar, electric keyboards and bass guitar.   The style was invented in Chaiyaphum province around 1985 and was popularised over the next few years after it was taken up by Ratdri Sivilai in Khon Kaen. It is based on the Khon Kaen style of lam tang san but incorporates string instrumentation and luk thung singing styles and extensive use of the Central Thai language rather than Isan.

The songs are often about disappointment in love and hardships during life away from Northeast Thailand. The songs are full of sexual innuendo, and feature "hang khreuang" - young female dancers in fanciful dress.

Among the most popular mor lam sing artists are the groups Rock Salaeng and Rock Sadert.

See also
Mor lam

External links
khaen

Popular music
Mor lam